Epitoxis is a genus of moths in the subfamily Arctiinae. The genus was described by Wallengren in 1863.

Species
 Epitoxis albicincta Hampson, 1903
 Epitoxis amazoula Boisduval, 1847
 Epitoxis ansorgei Rothschild, 1910
 Epitoxis borguensis Hampson, 1901
 Epitoxis ceryxoides Berio, 1941
 Epitoxis duplicata Gaede, 1926
 Epitoxis erythroderma Aurivillius, 1925
 Epitoxis myopsychoides Strand, 1912
 Epitoxis namaqua de Freina & Mey, 2011
 Epitoxis nigra Hampson, 1903
 Epitoxis procridia Hampson, 1898
 Epitoxis stempfferi Kiriakoff, 1953

References

External links

Arctiinae